Walter Wilson was an English footballer who played in the Football League for Everton.

Early career
Walter Wilson was an Everton reserve player. He was not retained for season 1889-1890.

League debut
Walter Wilson made his League Debut on 30 March 1889 at Anfield, Liverpool against Blackburn Rovers. It was Everton' last match of the 1888-1889 season. Wilson was left-back, replacing Alec Dick. The match was originally scheduled for 5 January 1889 but the referee would not allow the match to start as the pitch was covered in ice. Alf Milward put Everton ahead but Blackburn soon equalised. Half-time - Everton 1-1 Blackburn Rovers. The second-half belonged to Everton. David Waugh restored Everton' lead and Joe Davies made it 3-1. Everton cruised after that to achieve a comfortable win against one of that season' top teams. Full-Time Everton 3-1 Blackburn Rovers.

1888-1889 Season
Wilson played just the one match, at left-back, for Everton and when he played his team conceded 1 out of 47 goals conceded for the season. Everton finished eighth in the League.

End of career
Walter Wilson was not retained for 1889-1890 and nothing is known about him after he left Everton.

References

1865 births
English footballers
Everton F.C. players
English Football League players
Association football defenders
Year of death missing